Wormington is a village and former civil parish, now in the parish of Dumbleton, in the Tewkesbury district, in Gloucestershire, England. In 1931 the parish had a population of 67.

Wormington was an ancient parish, and became a civil parish in 1866, but on 1 April 1935 the civil parish was abolished and merged into the parish of Dumbleton.

St Catherine's parish church is reputed to have been built in 1475 by the abbot of Hailes Abbey on the site of a 12th-century church.  It is a Grade II* listed building.

Wormington Grange, a mile south of the village but just over the parish boundary in the neighbouring parish of Stanton, is a Grade II* listed country house.

References

External links 

Villages in Gloucestershire
Former civil parishes in Gloucestershire
Dumbleton